Florian is a 1940 American romantic drama film directed by Edwin L. Marin, and starring Robert Young and Helen Gilbert. It is loosely based on the novel Florian by Felix Salten.

Plot
A young groom, Anton, has grown up in Austria a friend of the duchess, Diana, despite their differences in social class. Anton trains a gifted stallion, Florian, for her father, the emperor. Archduke Oliver is the intended husband for the emperor's daughter, but he is killed in battle.

When war ravages the country, Anton is able to assist Diana in crossing the Switzerland border to safety. But he is arrested on returning home. The horse, Florian, is sold to Max Borelli, a carnival worker from New York City who takes him there, then treats him abusively and eventually sells the horse for a fraction of its worth.

Anton is freed and, accompanied by Dr. Hofer, his veterinarian, travels to New York to begin a new life. While he is there, Anton manages to find Florian, return him to good health and make him the splendid horse he used to be. Diana becomes aware of their presence and all are happily reunited.

Cast
Robert Young as Anton Erban 
Helen Gilbert as Duchess Diana
Charles Coburn as Dr. Johannes Hofer
Lee Bowman as Archduke Oliver
Reginald Owen as Emperor Franz Josef
Lucile Watson as Countess
Irina Baronova as Trina
Rand Brooks as Victor
S. Z. Sakall as Max
William B. Davidson as Archduke Franz Ferdinand
George Lloyd as Marco Borelli
George Irving as Bantry
Charles Judels as Editor
Adrian Morris as Cpl. Ernst

External links

1940 films
American romantic drama films
Films about horses
Films directed by Edwin L. Marin
Films set in Vienna
Films set in the 1910s
Films scored by Franz Waxman
Metro-Goldwyn-Mayer films
Films based on works by Felix Salten
1940 romantic drama films
American black-and-white films
1940s historical romance films
American historical romance films
Films with screenplays by Noel Langley
1940s English-language films
1940s American films